Patrick Rafter and Bryan Shelton were the defending champions, but did not participate this year.

Joshua Eagle and Andrew Florent won the title, defeating Ellis Ferreira and Rick Leach 6–4, 6–7, 6–3 in the final.

Seeds
Champion seeds are indicated in bold text while text in italics indicates the round in which those seeds were eliminated.
  Todd Woodbridge /  Mark Woodforde (quarterfinals)
  Ellis Ferreira /  Rick Leach (final)
  Neil Broad /  Piet Norval (first round)
 Patrick Galbraith /  Brett Steven (quarterfinals)

Draw

Finals

References

Next Generation Adelaide International
1998 ATP Tour
1998 in Australian tennis